James Reid Kerr (4 December 1883 – 19 August 1963) was a Scottish sportsman who played both rugby union and cricket for his country. He was also part of the first official British & Irish Lions team that toured South Africa in 1910.

Early life
James Reid Kerr was born on 4 December 1883 in Greenock, Renfrewshire, Scotland. He was the son of Robert Kerr, a Sugar Refiner. After attending Greenock Collegiate and Glasgow University he worked for his father as a Sugar Chemist.

Rugby Union career

Amateur career

Kerr played as a rugby forward for his local side, Greenock Wanderers RFC.

Provincial career

He captained the South Western District side against North of Scotland District in 1906.

He played for Glasgow District in the 1909 inter-city match against Edinburgh District.

International career

He played one game for Scotland, vs England at Richmond on 20 March 1909

The following year, he was selected for the first official British tour to South Africa (in that it was sanctioned and selected by the four Home Nations official governing bodies).

Cricket career

Kerr also played cricket for Greenock as a Right-hand bat. In 279 matches he scored 5,262 runs at an average of 23.08, and he had a top score of 119. He went on to play for Scotland, making only one appearance in 1921. That was against Ireland. In that match he scored 15 runs over two innings. He was also the cousin of the famous Scottish cricketer, John Kerr.

First World War
James Reid Kerr served as a captain the Argyll and Sutherland Highlanders during the First World War. During the war he saw action in the Gallipoli campaign in 1915.

See also
 List of Scottish cricket and rugby union players

References

1883 births
1963 deaths
Cricketers from Greenock
Glasgow District (rugby union) players
Greenock Wanderers RFC players
Rugby union players from Greenock
Scotland international rugby union players
Scottish cricketers
Scottish rugby union players
South Western District players
Rugby union forwards